The December 2016 Baghdad bombings was a pair of bomb blasts targeting a market during a rush hour in central Baghdad. The attack kills at least 28 people and another 50 were injured.

References

2016 murders in Iraq
21st-century mass murder in Iraq
2010s in Baghdad
ISIL terrorist incidents in Iraq
Islamic terrorist incidents in 2016
Mass murder in 2016
Massacres in 2016
December 2016 crimes in Asia
December 2016 events in Iraq
2016-12
Terrorist incidents in Iraq in 2016